Maria Elena Zavala (born 1950) is an American plant biologist. She was the first Mexican-American woman to earn a PhD in botany in the United States. She is currently a full professor of biology at the California State University-Northridge, studying plant development. She is a Fellow of the American Association for the Advancement of Science, the first Latina fellow of the American Society of Plant Biologists, the first Latina fellow of the American Society of Cell Biology, and an elected fellow of the Institute of Science. In 2000, she was awarded the Presidential Award for Excellence in Science, Mathematics, and Engineering Mentoring, which recognises individuals who have increased the participation of underrepresented minorities in their fields.

Early life and education 
Zavala grew up in La Verne, California, and was one of five children. When she was young, her parents were farm workers, and picked lemons in the farms of Southern California.

She credits her interest in plant biology to her grandmother, who was a curandera (a traditional medicine healer), and her father, who grew roses in their garden. She carried out her first experiments in plant biology at the age of seven, when she compared the growth of lentils in the sunlight and in the shade.

In high school, she worked as a teaching assistant in chemistry and biology. She was also in her school band.

Zavala went to Pomona College, where she majored in botany in 1972. She was awarded a Ford Foundation doctoral fellowship to continue her studies, and went on to do a PhD in plant cell biology at the University of California, Berkeley, graduating in 1978.

Research and career 
Throughout her career, Zavala has worked at the United States Department of Agriculture, Yale University, as well as Michigan State University. She has worked at the California State University-Northridge since 1988.

Zavala's research focuses on plant development, specifically the structure of roots. She focuses her research on beans and corn, with the aim of creating crops that can resist cooler temperatures. Her research has been funded by the National Science Foundation, the United States Department of Agriculture, and the National Institutes of Health.

Zavala has also taken a keen interest in education equity, by helping to develop science curricula, and by establishing and directing programs to champion the participation of women and minorities in science. For example, she has been involved in American Women in Science, Women in Science and Engineering, Women in Cell Biology, the American Society of Plant Biologists Minority Affairs Committee, and the American Society for Cell Biology Minority Affairs Committee. Between 2001 and 2002, Zavala also served as the first Chicana president of the Society of Advancement of Chicanos and Native Americans in Science. She spoke at the 2017 Los Angeles March for Science.

Additionally, she has been the director of CSUN’s Maximizing Access to Research Careers (MARC) Undergraduate Student Training in Academic Research (U-STAR) program since 1990, as well as the Research Initiatives for Scientific Enhancement (RISE) since 1993.

She contributed to the book "Flor y Ciencia: Chicanas in Mathematics, Science and Engineering".

Awards and honours 
Zavala is a Fellow of the American Association for the Advancement of Science. In 2000, she became the first woman to become president of SACNAS, the Society for the Advancement of Chicanos and Native Americans in Science, and in 2016 she became the first Latina fellow of the American Society of Plant Biologists. The next year, she became the first Latina fellow of the American Society for Cell Biology. William Jefferson Clinton awarded her the Presidential Award for Excellence in Science, Mathematics, and Engineering Mentoring in 2000.  In 2020 Zavala was named one of the 100 most inspiring Latinx/Hispanic scientists in the United States by Cell Press journal.

References 

1950 births
People from La Verne, California
Fellows of the American Association for the Advancement of Science
California State University, Northridge faculty
American women biologists
Pomona College alumni
Living people
Fellows of the American Society for Cell Biology
20th-century American women scientists
21st-century American women scientists
American women academics